Elena Meerovna Akselrod (born 1932 in Minsk, Belarus) is a Russian poet and translator. She is the daughter of noted artist Meer Akselrod, and wrote a monograph about her father.

Biography
Akselrod was born in Minsk in 1932. Her father was the artist Meer Akselrod and her mother was the Yiddish poet, Riva Rubina. Her uncle Zelik Akserlod was also a Yiddish poet; he tried to protest against closure of Yiddish schools in USSR and was arrested and eventually executed during the Red Army retreat from Vilnius in 1941.

Elena Akselrod graduated from the literary department of Moskovsky Pedagogichesky Institute (Moscow Pedagogical Institute) in 1954, and made her début as a translator in 1955. She published her first book of poetry for children in 1961 - since then she has written a further seven books of poetry. During Soviet times she worked as translator, translating from Yiddish, German, English, and other languages. She translated the works of her mother Riva Rubina.

Since 1991 Akselrod has lived in Israel, where she has written books and translated others from Hebrew. Her work is published in Israel, the United States, and Russia. She wrote a study on the art of her father Meer Akselrod, which made him known outside of Russia. In 2008, her book of memoirs A Yard on Barrikadny street was published.

Her son is Russian-Israeli artist Michael Yachilevich.

References

Sources 
 Стихи Елены Аксельрод, Poetry of Elena Akselrod
 Ю. Герчук Меер Аксельрод («Общая тетрадь. Три поколения семьи Аксельрод. (Т. 1: Меер Аксельрод. Графика. Зелик Аксельрод. Стихи. Т. 2: Михаил Яхилевич. Живопись. Елена Аксельрод. Стихи.)») Москва. ГМИИ им. Пушкина. (Three generations of Akselrod family. Pushkin Museum in Moscow)
 Иерусалимская антология, «Имена: Елена Аксельрод» Jerusalem anthology. Names: Elena Akselrod

1932 births
Living people
Writers from Minsk
Belarusian Jews
Russian women poets
Soviet women poets
Soviet poets
20th-century Russian women writers
Belarusian women writers
20th-century Belarusian writers